Cullicudden  is an ancient village located close to the southeast shore of the Cromarty Firth, 2 miles northeast of Dingwall, on the west shore of the Black Isle in Ross-shire, Scottish Highlands and is in the Scottish council area of Highland.

Settlements
Cullicuden is located 4 miles west-south-west of Invergordon and 25.5 miles north of Inverness.

References

Populated places on the Black Isle